The prime minister of the Republic of Belarus is the deputy head of government of Belarus. Until 1991, it was known as the Chairman of the Council of Ministers of the Byelorussian Soviet Socialist Republic as the head of the government of the constituent republic of the Soviet Union.

The prime minister leads the Council of Ministers of Belarus, the central government body, and is accountable to the president. The prime minister is appointed by the president of Belarus.  Once the prime minister is appointed they form a 30-member cabinet which consists of ministers and chairmen, the latter of which is a non-ministerial post.
As Belarus is a presidential republic the prime minister has no real power or control over government affairs and it is ultimately under direct control of the president who has the real power over government and its activities.

The activities of the prime minister in managing the government include:

Signing government legislation 
Inform the President on the basic guidelines of the government
Draft budget
Enforce a uniform financial, monetary, education, health care, and labour policy
Ensure the implementation of decrees and instructions of the president

The official workplace of the prime minister is at Government House on Independence Square.

List of prime ministers of Belarus since 1991

See also
List of national leaders of Belarus
President of Belarus
List of prime ministers of Belarus
National Assembly of Belarus

References

Government of Belarus
Prime Ministers of Belarus
Prime Ministers of Belarus